Ilse Peternell (born 2 December 1928) is an Austrian actress who appeared in more than forty films during her career. During the 1940s and 1950 she played female leads in films such as Winter Melody (1947). She gradually switched to supporting and character roles.

Selected filmography
 Winter Melody (1947)
 Ideal Woman Sought (1952)
 Open Your Window (1953)
 The Emperor Waltz (1953)
 Roses from the South (1954)
 The Congress Dances (1955)
 Emperor's Ball (1956)
 Love, Girls and Soldiers (1958)
 Our Crazy Aunts (1961)
 Our Crazy Aunts in the South Seas (1964)
 The Priest of St. Pauli (1970)
 When You're With Me (1970)

References

Bibliography
 Fritsche, Maria. Homemade Men in Postwar Austrian Cinema: Nationhood, Genre and Masculinity. Berghahn Books, 2013.

External links

1928 births
Possibly living people
Austrian film actresses